Tetraopes femoratus is a species of beetle in the family Cerambycidae. It was described by John Lawrence LeConte in 1847. It is known from Mexico and the United States.

References

Tetraopini
Beetles described in 1847